is a passenger railway station located in the city of Gyōda, Saitama, Japan, operated by the private railway operator Chichibu Railway

Lines
Chichibuji express services stop at this station.

Station layout
The station consists of a single island platform serving two tracks.

Platforms

Adjacent stations

History
The station opened on 1 April 1921 as Gyōda Station. It was renamed Gyōdashi Station from 1 June 1966 to distinguish it from Gyōda Station on the JNR Takasaki Line.

Passenger statistics
In fiscal 2018, the station was used by an average of 1718 passengers daily.

Surrounding area
 Gyōda City Office

References

External links

  

Stations of Chichibu Railway
Railway stations in Japan opened in 1921
Railway stations in Saitama Prefecture
Gyōda